Rama O Rama is a 1988 Indian Bollywood film directed and produced by Mirza Brothers. It stars Raj Babbar, Aasif Sheikh, Kimi Katkar in lead roles and music was composed by R. D. Burman.

Plot
Monu & Sonu are brothers. They had extreme poverty. After their mother's death, their greedy and drunkard stepfather Sukhiya (Gulshan Grover) has sold Monu to a underworld don Anjani Rai (Raza Murad), but Sonu managed to escape, then found & brought up by a Christian family. Years later, Monu becomes Sandeep Rai (Raj Babbar) & he takes over the underworld business. On the other side, his brother Sonu, who calls himself Ricky (Aasif Sheikh) works as a drum player in a club. Vicky falls in love with Hema (Kimi Katkar), who is a daughter of John D'Souza (Pran). Meanwhile Sandeep also falls in love with Hema, he forces Hema to marry him. At the day of marriage Sandeep died saving his brother Ricky from Sukhiya and his friends Anjani Rai & Sahu Dada (Kiran Kumar) who tries to kill Ricky.

Cast
 Raj Babbar as Monu / Sandeep Rai
 Aasif Sheikh as Sonu / Vicky
 Kimi Katkar as Hema D'Souza
 Pran as John D'Souza
 Raza Murad as Anjani Rai
 Kiran Kumar as Sahu Dada
 Gulshan Grover as Sukhiya
 Shiva as Johny D'Souza

Soundtrack

External links

1980s Hindi-language films
1988 films
Films scored by R. D. Burman